The 1956 Texas Western Miners football team was an American football team that represented Texas Western College (now known as University of Texas at El Paso) as a member of the Border Conference during the 1956 NCAA University Division football season. In its seventh and final season under head coach Mike Brumbelow, the team compiled a 9–2 record (5–0 against Border Conference opponents), won the conference championship, and outscored all opponents by a total of 305 to 78.

The team's statistical leaders included quarterback Bob Laraba with 568 passing yards and 743 yards of total offense, Jimmy Bevers with 606 rushing yards and 54 points scored, halfback Don Maynard with 275 receiving yards, and end Bob Forrest with 849 all-purpose yards. Maynard later played 17 years of professional football and was inducted into the Pro Football Hall of Fame.

Five Texas Western players received first-team honors on the 1956 All-Border Conference team: Laraba; Maynard; Forrest; guard Ken George; and tackle Keith Wharton. Mike Brumbelow was also named Border Conference Coach of the Year.

Schedule

References

Texas Western
UTEP Miners football seasons
Border Conference football champion seasons
Texas Western Miners football